Slipstream is a video by Jethro Tull, recorded during the 1980 A tour, released for the first time in 1981. It was originally released on VHS, Capacitance Electronic Disc, and laserdisc, and was released as a (bootleg) DVD in Brazil (as seen in the cover on the right) in 2003.  It is also included in the (2004) bonus DVD edition of A. This bonus DVD was the only official release on DVD until it was released as part of the 40th anniversary box set of A in April 2021.

Music videos 
Slipstream mixed the concert tour with the videos recorded and directed by David Mallett. The London's Hammersmith Odeon was used for exterior scenes, but the main concert footage was actually from a performance at the Los Angeles Sports Arena (as heard on the Magic Piper ROIO), filmed in November 1980. The music videos are:
 "Dun Ringill"
A video inspired by the Stormwatch album cover, filmed at a beach near Beachy Head.
 "Sweet Dream"
In this a vampire-themed homage to horror movies, Aqualung is pursued by a vampire and — like the Prisoner — giant pink balloons.  Meanwhile, a ballerina pirouettes (recalling A Passion Play), a giant tarantula emits death rays, and an evil projectionist starts his movie. Luckily, a Nun supplies the right equipment to defeat the vampire.
 "Too Old To Rock 'n' Roll"
The elderly band is in a giant pinball machine, drinking their tea like the Alice in Wonderland tea party. Features Hot Gossip dancer Perri Lister.
 "Fylingdale Flyer"
The band is in an air traffic control tower, when they see some impending disaster. The cover of A is taken from this video. RAF Fylingdales (note the 's') is the site of a Ballistic Missile Early Warning System radar situated in the North York Moors National Park, which explains the lyric to the song.

Track list

Personnel 
Jethro Tull
Ian Anderson - flute, vocals
Martin Barre - electric guitar
Mark Craney - drums, bass in "Skating Away"
Dave Pegg - bass, bouzouki in "Skating Away"
Eddie Jobson - keyboards, electric violin, electric mandolin in "Skating Away"

See also 
 A (1980 album)

References

External links 
 
 Slipstream (1981) at Allmovie
  (Bonus DVD)
 A at Progressive World
 1980 A Concert Tour

Jethro Tull (band) video albums
Jethro Tull (band) live albums
1981 video albums
Live video albums
1981 live albums
Films directed by David Mallet (director)